Melaleuca barlowii is a plant in the myrtle family, Myrtaceae and is endemic to the south-west of Western Australia. It is similar to a number of other Western Australian melaleucas such as M. conothamnoides with its purple pom-pom flower heads but is a more erect shrub with different leaves and the fruiting clusters have a different shape.

Description

The flowers are a shade of pink to purple and arranged in heads or short spikes on the ends of branches which continue to grow after flowering, sometimes also in the upper leaf axils. The stamens are arranged in bundles of five around the flower, with 9 to 11 stamens in each bundle.

Taxonomy and naming
Melaleuca barlowii was first formally described in 1999 by Lyndley Craven and Brendan Lepschi in Australian Systematic Botany from a specimen collected near Tardun. The specific epithet (barlowii) is in honour of Bryan Alwyn Barlow, melaleuca specialist and expert in the mistletoe family, Loranthaceae.

Distribution and habitat
This melaleuca occurs in the Mullewa and Perenjori districts in the Avon Wheatbelt and Yalgoo biogeographic regions. It grows in sand and clay loam in shrubland and in roadside reserves.

Conservation status
Melaleuca barlowii is listed as "Priority Three" by the Government of Western Australia Department of Parks and Wildlife, meaning that it is known from only a few locations and is not currently in imminent danger.

References 

barlowii
Myrtales of Australia
Plants described in 1999
Endemic flora of Western Australia
Taxa named by Lyndley Craven